Nickelodeon is an American pay television channel.

Nickelodeon may also refer to:

 Nickelodeon (movie theater), an early 20th-century form of small neighborhood movie theater

Instruments
 An instrument used by the pop band Sailor
 A coin-operated player piano or orchestrion or a jukebox

Media and entertainment

Film
 Nickelodeon (film), a 1976 comedy film about the silent movie era
 The Nickelodeon Theatre, run by the Columbia Film Society
The Nickelodeon, an early 20th-century film magazine that became Motography

Music
 Nickelodeon, a 1973 album by Hudson Ford
 Nickelodeon, a 1971 album by The Masters Apprentices

Television
 Spinoffs of the Nickelodeon channel:
 Nickelodeon Animation Studio, the channel's animation arm
 Nickelodeon around the world
 Nickelodeon Games and Sports for Kids, a former TV channel
 Nickelodeon Magazine, a children's magazine
 Nickelodeon Movies, a motion picture production company
 Nickelodeon Studios, a former television studio
 Nickelodeon toys, toys related to the channel
 Nickelodeon Universe, an amusement park

Other
 Nickelodeon, a 2010 manga by Dowman Sayman

See also
 TeenNick (disambiguation)